Juan Carlos Corbalan (born 3 March 1997) is a Maltese footballer who plays as a winger for Maltese Premier League club Ħamrun Spartans F.C. and the Malta national team.

Club career 

Corbalan started his career within Balzan's youth system, making his debut for the senior team on 24 February 2013 in a 3–1 win against Ħamrun Spartans. In the end of January 2015, he joined the Virtus Lanciano's Primavera squad for a six-month period.

In the summer of 2016, Corbalan joined Gżira United, making his debut in the third game of the 2016–17 season, a 1–0 win against Sliema Wanderers. His first goal in the Premier League came on 22 September, scoring the last goal in a 3–0 win against Pembroke Athleta. Corbalan played for the first time in a European competition, coming on in the last few minutes of the 2017–18 UEFA Europa League preliminary round tie against Sant Julià played on 5 July 2017.

International career 

Corbalan was selected as part of the Maltese squad for the 2014 UEFA European Under-17 Championship, playing in all three matches in the group stage.

Following appearances with the under-21 team, Corbalan was selected for the first time with the senior team for the matches against Faroe Islands and Azerbaijan as part of the 2018–19 UEFA Nations League D. His official debut came in the same competition, in the 1–3 defeat against Kosovo on 11 October 2018.

Career statistics

International

International goals 

"Score" represents the score in the match after Corbalan's goal.

References

External links 
 
 

1997 births
Living people
Maltese footballers
Balzan F.C. players
Gżira United F.C. players
Maltese Premier League players
Association football wingers
Malta youth international footballers
Malta international footballers
Maltese people of Spanish descent